The 2018–19 season of the Belgian First Division B began in August 2018 and ended in April 2019. It was the third season of the First Division B following a change in league format from the old Belgian Second Division.

The season was impacted by the 2017–19 Belgian football fraud scandal which most notably involved Mechelen, as it was unclear upon completion of the season whether and how any involved clubs would be sanctioned and what the effect would be on the number of promotion and relegation places. As a result, Mechelen won the title and celebrated promotion on 16 March 2019, following a win over Beerschot Wilrijk in the promotion-playoffs, although the verdict on the investigation was still pending. End of May, Mechelen was found guilty and not allowed to be promoted, with runners-up Beerschot Wilrijk taking their spot instead. Mechelen appealed the decision at the Belgian Court for Sportsarbitration, which confirmed the verdict of guilt in July, but also ruled that according to the rules of the Belgian Football FA Mechelen could not be penalized with relegation back to the Belgian First Division A as the violation occurred during a previous season, hence Mechelen was allowed to keep its promotion.

Team changes

In
 Mechelen were relegated from the 2017–18 Belgian First Division A after finishing in last place and return to the second level of Belgian football for the first time since the 2006–07 season.
 Lommel were promoted as 2017–18 Belgian First Amateur Division winners, immediately returning after being relegated from the 2016–17 Belgian First Division B.

Out
 Cercle Brugge won the promotion play-offs against Beerschot-Wilrijk and was thus promoted after three seasons at the second level.
 Lierse went bankrupt and dissolved as a team. Tubize had finished in last place in the relegation playoffs but were saved from relegation as a result of the bankruptcy of Lierse.

Team information

Stadiums and locations

Personnel and kits

Managerial changes

League table

Opening tournament

Closing tournament

Aggregate table

Promotion play-offs
The winners of the opening tournament and the closing tournament will meet in a two-legged match to determine the division champion, who will promote to the 2019–20 Belgian First Division A. The team finishing highest in the aggregate table will be allowed to play the second leg at home. In case a single team wins both the opening and the closing tournament, that team will be promoted automatically and no play-offs will be organized.

On 9 November 2018, Mechelen won the opening tournament and was therefore assured of playing at least the promotion play-offs. On the final day of the closing tournament, Mechelen only managed a draw away to Lommel, allowing Beerschot Wilrijk to win the closing period. If Mechelen had won they would have assured direct promotion, instead they had to face Beerschot-Wilrijk in the promotion play-offs.

The first leg saw both teams having chances, with goalkeeper Michael Verrips making big saves in the first half to deny attempts by Erwin Hoffer and Gertjan De Mets, while in the second half Mechelen failed to take advantage of a red card for Jan Van den Bergh. In the second leg, Beerschot-Wilrijk again saw a player sent off following a vicious tackle by Marius Noubissi already after 32 minutes. Nikola Storm opened the score for Mechelen just after the start of the second half, but ten-men Beerschot-Wilrijk managed the equalizer through penalty kick and looked on its way to promote via the away goals rule, when substitute Clément Tainmont scored a volley just two minutes from time to win the match and send Mechelen back to the highest division after just one season in the Belgian First Division B. With that, Beerschot Wilrijk lost the promotion play-offs for the second consecutive year. Several weeks later, Mechelen was found guilty of match-fixing and not allowed to promote as a result, with Beerschot-Wilrijk taking their spot. Mechelen appealed the decision successfully, as per the rules of the Belgian FA they could no longer be punished for events of more than one year in the past.

Mechelen won 2–1 on aggregate.

Relegation play-offs
The four bottom teams in the aggregate table took part in the relegation play-offs in which they keep half of the points they collected during the overall regular season (rounded up).  As a result, the teams started with the following points before the playoff: Roeselare 17 points, Lommel 16, OH Leuven 15 and Tubize 12 points. As the points of all teams were rounded up, the half point deduction was not relevant in case of ties. Roeselare started matchday 5 with 2 points, but the game, away against Lommel ended in a 0-1 win for Roeselare, giving them 3 points and tying with Tubize in points. On matchday 6 of 6, coincidentally, Roeselare met Tubize, and defeated them 4-0. As a result, Tubize were relegated to the Belgian First Amateur Division.

Season statistics

Top scorers

5 goals (6 players)

  Jan Van den Bergh (Beerschot Wilrijk)
  Rob Schoofs (Mechelen)
  Nikola Storm (Mechelen)
  Joachim Van Damme (Mechelen)
  Elliott Moore (OH Leuven)
  Saviour Godwin (Roeselare)

4 goals (3 players)

  Laurens Vermijl (Lommel)
  Thibaut Van Acker (Roeselare)
  Lukas Van Eenoo (Westerlo)

3 goals (16 players)

  Erwin Hoffer (Beerschot Wilrijk)
  Sebastiaan Brebels (Lommel)
  Glenn Claes (Lommel)
  Clément Tainmont (Mechelen)
  William Togui (Mechelen)
  Joeri Dequevy (OH Leuven)
  Bartosz Kapustka (OH Leuven)
  Derrick Tshimanga (OH Leuven)
  Mohammed Aoulad (Roeselare)
  Andrei Camargo (Roeselare)
  Esteban Casagolda (Roeselare)
  Nicolas Rajsel (Roeselare)
  Ernest Agyiri (Tubize)
  Pedro Henrique (Tubize)
  Anthony Schuster (Tubize)
  Thibault Peyre (Union SG)

2 goals (17 players)

  Denis Prychynenko (Beerschot Wilrijk)
  Jorn Vancamp (Beerschot Wilrijk)
  Tom Van Hyfte (Beerschot Wilrijk)
  Glenn Neven (Lommel)
  Sam Valcke (Lommel)
  Mathieu Cornet (Mechelen)
  Arjan Swinkels (Mechelen)
  George Hirst (OH Leuven)
  Samy Kehli (OH Leuven)
  Kjetil Borry (Roeselare)
  Baptiste Schmisser (Roeselare)
  Arsenio Valpoort (Roeselare)
  Hugo Vidémont (Tubize)
  Pietro Perdichizzi (Union SG)
  Ambroise Gboho (Westerlo)
  Nader Ghandri (Westerlo)
  Sava Petrov (Westerlo)

1 goal (32 players)

  Pierre Bourdin (Beerschot Wilrijk)
  Alexander Maes (Beerschot Wilrijk)
  Euloge Placca Fessou (Beerschot Wilrijk)
  Robin Henkens (Lommel)
  Daan Heymans (Lommel)
  Seth De Witte (Mechelen)
  Onur Kaya (Mechelen)
  Germán Mera (Mechelen)
  Yannick Aguemon (OH Leuven)
  Julien Gorius (OH Leuven)
  Redouane Kerrouche (OH Leuven)
  Jarno Libert (OH Leuven)
  Olivier Myny (OH Leuven)
  Koen Persoons (OH Leuven)
  Kenneth Schuermans (OH Leuven)
  Stijn De Smet (Roeselare)
  Guy Dufour (Roeselare)
  Kingsley Madu (Roeselare)
  Emile Samyn (Roeselare)
  Gino van Kessel (Roeselare)
  Dejan Čabraja (Tubize)
  Shean Garlito (Tubize)
  Lemouya Goudiaby (Tubize)
  Aaron Nemane (Tubize)
  Marco Weymans (Tubize)
  Mathias Fixelles (Union SG)
  Serge Tabekou (Union SG)
  Fabien Antunes (Westerlo)
  Maxime Biset (Westerlo)
  Stephen Buyl (Westerlo)
  Nicolas Rommens (Westerlo)
  Noël Soumah (Westerlo)

1 own goal (8 players)

  Maxime Biset (Westerlo, scored for Mechelen)
  Gaëtan Coucke (Lommel, scored for Mechelen)
  Joren Dom (Beerschot Wilrijk, scored for Roeselare)
  Salomon Nirisarike (Tubize, scored for Mechelen)
  Pietro Perdichizzi (Union SG, scored for Tubize)
  Baptiste Schmisser (Roeselare, scored for Mechelen)
  Noël Soumah (Westerlo, scored for Mechelen)
  Jorn Vancamp (Beerschot Wilrijk, scored for Lommel)

Team of the season
Upon completion of the regular season a team of the season award was compiled, based upon the results of the team of the week results throughout the season, constructed based on nominations from managers, assistant-managers, journalists and analysts. The results were announced from 22 March 2019, with one player revealed each day.

Number of teams by provinces

Notes

References

Belgian First Division B seasons
Bel
2